The Detroit Shock were a Women's National Basketball Association (WNBA) team based in Auburn Hills, Michigan. They were the 2003, 2006, and 2008 WNBA champions.

Debuting in 1998, the Shock were one of the league's first expansion franchises. They were also the first WNBA expansion franchise to win a WNBA Championship. The team was the sister team of the Detroit Pistons and from 2002 to the 2009 season was coached by Pistons legend Bill Laimbeer.

On October 20, 2009, it was announced that the Shock would be moving to Tulsa, Oklahoma to play in the new downtown arena, the BOK Center. Former men's college coach Nolan Richardson was named the team's new head coach. The Shock roster and history was retained along with the Shock name, but the team colors were changed to black, red, and gold. The franchise is currently known as Dallas Wings.

Franchise history

The early years (1998–2002) 
The Detroit Shock were one of the first WNBA expansion teams and began play in 1998. The Shock quickly brought in a blend of rookies and veterans. The Shock's first coach was Hall of Famer Nancy Lieberman. The Shock would start out their inaugural season 0–4, but would put together an amazing expansion season, and finish 17–13, missing out on the postseason by one game.

In 1999 franchise recruited future FIBA Hall of Famer, Razija Mujanović, who had productive season with the Shocks, who finished 15–17, in a three-way tie for the playoffs with the Orlando Miracle and the Charlotte Sting. The Shock and Sting played a one-game playoff, which the Shock would lose 60–54.

In 2000, the Shock would finish with a 14–18 record and end tied for the last seed. This time, the Shock would lose the tiebreaker and not qualify, losing to the Washington Mystics. Lieberman was fired after the season and replaced by Greg Williams.

In the 2001 WNBA Draft, the Shock would select Deanna Nolan with the sixth overall pick. She would later develop into a star. The 2001 Shock would finish the season with a 10–22 record, this time tying three teams for last place in the Eastern Conference.

The 2002 Shock started the season 0–10, at which point Williams was fired and replaced by former Detroit Pistons legend Bill Laimbeer. The team finished the season 9–23, but Laimbeer's ideas influenced the team's front office, who agreed with the new coach's ideas, including bringing over some new players that he felt were necessary for the Shock to become a contender.

From worst to champions (2003)
After massive changes to the roster, Bill Laimbeer predicted before the 2003 season that the Shock would be league champions. The Shock would dominate the East in the regular season, posting a 25–9 record and winning the #1 seed by seven games. In the playoffs, the Shock would defeat the Cleveland Rockers 2–1 for their first playoff series win in franchise history. In the Conference Finals, the Shock swept the Connecticut Sun 2–0 to reach the WNBA Finals. Despite the achievements, the Shock were viewed as huge underdogs to the two-time defending champion Los Angeles Sparks, who were looking for a three-peat. The Shock would emerge victorious in the series, winning a thrilling Game 3 83–78. That game would draw the largest crowd in WNBA history. Ruth Riley was named WNBA Finals MVP. With the win, the Shock became the first American pro sports team to go from having the worst overall record in the league to being champions in the following season.

Return to mediocrity (2004–2005)
The Shock would stumble after their championship season and play mediocre basketball in the 2004 season. The Shock would post a 17–17 record, qualifying for the playoffs as the #3 seed. The Shock would take the series against the New York Liberty the full three games, but would fall in the end 2–1.

In the offseason, former Pistons star Rick Mahorn was hired as an assistant coach. Much like the previous season, the Shock played mediocre basketball, posting a 16–18 record, which was good enough to secure the #4 seed. In the playoffs, the Shock would get swept by the Connecticut Sun.

Back to the top (2006–2008)
The Shock performed well during the regular season, posting a 23–11 record to secure the #2 seed in the playoffs. The Shock went on to make quick work of the Indiana Fever, sweeping them in the first round. In the Conference Finals, the Shock would be matched up against the Connecticut Sun. This time, the Shock emerged victorious from the hard-fought series, winning it 2–1. In the WNBA Finals, which were now best-of-five, the Shock faced the defending champion Sacramento Monarchs. The Shock lost Game 1, getting handily defeated 95–71 at home. The Shock rallied in Game 2 to even up the series 1–1. Going to Sacramento, the Shock were defeated in Game 3 89–69. With their backs against the wall, the Shock dominated the Monarchs in Game 4, 72–52, setting up the crucial Game 5 in Detroit. Due to a scheduling conflict, Game 5 was played at Joe Louis Arena. At halftime in Game 5, the Shock would find themselves down 44–36. However, in the third quarter, the Shock would outscore the Monarchs 22–9, gaining a 58–53 lead going into the final quarter. The Shock held off the Monarchs in the last quarter to win the game 80–75, and the championship 3–2. Deanna Nolan was named WNBA Finals MVP.

In 2007, the Shock sought to defend their title. The Shock would finish with a WNBA-best 24–10 regular season record, and capture the #1 seed in the playoffs for the first time in franchise history. In the first round, the Shock were heavily favored against a New York Liberty team that was not predicted to make the postseason. However in Game 1, the Shock came out flat and were defeated 73–51. In Game 2, the Shock won 76–73 to force a Game 3. Game 3 was a battle, as the game went into overtime. In the end, the Shock would emerge the victors by the score of 71–70. In the Eastern Conference Finals, the Shock would face the Indiana Fever, with whom the Shock were bitter rivals. In Game 1, the Shock lost by the score of 75–65. The Shock rallied to win Games 2 and 3 by the scores of 77–63 and 81–65, respectively. In the WNBA Finals, the Shock faced the Phoenix Mercury, who had dominated the Western Conference all year long. The Shock won Game 1 108–100 at home. The Mercury evened the series up in Game 2, defeating the Shock 98–70. The series shifted to Phoenix for Games 3 and 4. The Shock won a rough Game 3 88–83. With a chance to win the championship in Game 4, the Shock and Mercury battled back and forth all game. When the dust cleared, the Mercury won 77–76, forcing a decisive Game 5 in Detroit. In Game 5, the Shock were dominated as they lost 108–92. With the loss, the Shock became the first team to lose the championship at home in WNBA history.

The following season, the Shock went 22–12, which was the best record in the East. In the first round against the Indiana Fever, the Shock defeated the Fever in three games. Due to the scheduling of other events at the Palace, the Shock had to play their remaining home games at Eastern Michigan University's Convocation Center in Ypsilanti. In the Conference Finals against the New York Liberty, the Shock would defeat the Liberty in three games to move on to the WNBA Finals against the league best San Antonio Silver Stars. Although the Silver Stars had the best record in the league in 2008, the Shock swept them to capture their third championship in franchise history. Katie Smith was named WNBA Finals MVP.

The final season in Detroit (2009)

Three games into the 2009 season, Bill Laimbeer announced his resignation as head coach. Rick Mahorn would take over as head coach. The Shock struggled in the first half of the season. However, in the second half, they would bounce back to ultimately finish with an 18–16 record, which was good enough to clinch a playoff berth for the seventh straight year. In the first round, the Shock swept the Atlanta Dream to advance to their fourth straight Eastern Conference Finals against the Indiana Fever. In the Eastern Conference Finals, the Shock were defeated by the Indiana Fever in three games, missing the WNBA Finals for the first time since 2005.

The end of the Detroit era
On October 19, 2009, the Associated Press reported that a Shock official stated that the team would be relocating to Tulsa. The following day, the decision was officially announced at a press conference in Tulsa.

Team identity

Logo and uniforms
From 2002 to 2009, the Shock's home uniforms were white with the stylized Shock name in red on the front, while road jerseys were blue with the word "Detroit" across the front in red and white. From 1998 to 2001, a more complex color scheme of teal, yellow and red was used.

Season-by-season records

Players

Final roster

Basketball Hall of Fame members

Notes:
 1 Lieberman signed a seven-day contract in 2008.

FIBA Hall of Famers

Notable players
Jennifer Azzi
Carla Boyd
Kara Braxton
Sandy Brondello
Cindy Brown
Dominique Canty
Swin Cash
Barbara Farris
Cheryl Ford
Korie Hlede
Kedra Holland-Corn
Alexis Hornbuckle
Tasha Humphrey
Shannon Johnson
Ivory Latta
Nancy Lieberman
Taj McWilliams-Franklin
Razija Mujanović
Astou Ndiaye-Diatta
Deanna Nolan
Wendy Palmer
Plenette Pierson
Elaine Powell
Ruth Riley
Sheri Sam
Katie Smith
Nikki Teasley
Lynette Woodard

Coaches and others

Head coaches:
Nancy Lieberman (1998–2000)
Greg Williams (2001–2002)
Bill Laimbeer (2002–2009)
Rick Mahorn (2009)

General managers:
Nancy Lieberman (1998–2000)
Greg Williams (2001–2002)
Bill Laimbeer (2002–2009)
Cheryl Reeve (2009)

Assistant coaches
Laurie Byrd (2003–2005)
Earl Cureton (2009)
Korie Hlede (2003–2004)
Rick Mahorn (2005–2009)
Cheryl Reeve (2006–2009)

Individual records and awards

Individual awards

WNBA Finals MVP
 Ruth Riley – 2003
 Deanna Nolan – 2006
 Katie Smith – 2008

WNBA Rookie of the Year
 Cheryl Ford – 2003

WNBA Sixth Woman of the Year
 Plenette Pierson – 2007

WNBA Coach of the Year
 Bill Laimbeer – 2003

All-WNBA First Team
 Deanna Nolan – 2005, 2007

All-WNBA Second Team
 Cindy Brown – 1998
 Swin Cash – 2003, 2004
 Cheryl Ford – 2003, 2006
 Deanna Nolan – 2003, 2008, 2009

WNBA All-Defensive First Team
 Deanna Nolan – 2007

WNBA All-Defensive Second Team
 Cheryl Ford – 2006
 Deanna Nolan – 2005, 2006, 2008, 2009
 Katie Smith – 2008

WNBA All-Rookie Team
 Kara Braxton – 2005
 Shavonte Zellous – 2009

WNBA Peak Performers
 Sandy Brondello – 1998
 Cheryl Ford – 2005, 2006

WNBA All-Star Game
All-Stars
1999: Sandy Brondello
2000: Wendy Palmer
2001: None
2002: None
2003: Swin Cash, Cheryl Ford, Deanna Nolan
2004: Cheryl Ford, Deanna Nolan
2005: Swin Cash, Cheryl Ford, Deanna Nolan, Ruth Riley
2006: Cheryl Ford, Deanna Nolan, Katie Smith
2007: Cheryl Ford, Deanna Nolan, Kara Braxton
2008: No All-Star Game
2009: Katie Smith

Head coach
 Bill Laimbeer – 2004, 2007

WNBA All-Star Game MVP
 Cheryl Ford – 2007

References 

 
Relocated Women's National Basketball Association teams
Basketball teams in Michigan
Basketball teams established in 1998
Basketball teams disestablished in 2009
Sports in Auburn Hills, Michigan